The 2014–15 St. Bonaventure Bonnies women's basketball team represented the St. Bonaventure University during the 2014–15 college basketball season. Jim Crowley assumes the responsibility as head coach for his fifteenth season. The Bonnies were members of the Atlantic 10 Conference and play their home games at the Reilly Center. They finished the season 15–15, 5–11 in A-10 play to finish in a four way tie for tenth place. They lost in the first round in the A-10 women's tournament to UMass.

2014–15 media
All non-televised Bonnies home games will air on the A-10 Digital Network. On radio, WGWE acquired broadcast rights to the team for the 2014–15 season.

Roster

Schedule

|-
!colspan=9 style="background:#7B3F00; color:#FFFFFF;"| Exhibition

|-
!colspan=9 style="background:#7B3F00; color:#FFFFFF;"| Regular Season

|-
!colspan=9 style="background:#7B3F00; color:#FFFFFF;"| Atlantic 10 Tournament

Rankings
2014–15 NCAA Division I women's basketball rankings

See also
 2014–15 St. Bonaventure Bonnies men's basketball team
 St. Bonaventure Bonnies women's basketball

References

St. Bonaventure Bonnies women's basketball seasons
St. Bonaventure